Sargus albibarbus is a European species of soldier fly.

References

Stratiomyidae
Diptera of Europe
Insects described in 1855
Taxa named by Hermann Loew